Field work or Fieldwork may refer to:
 Field work (scientific method)
 Field fortifications
 Fieldwork novel by American journalist Mischa Berlinski
 Field Work, poetry collection by Seamus Heaney